Nososticta fraterna is an Australian species of damselfly in the family Platycnemididae,
commonly known as the northern threadtail.

Its usual habitat is near rivers, riverine lagoons and streams. The adult is a small to medium-sized damselfly with a wingspan of 25 to 35mm. The adult is dark with pale stripes on the synthorax.  The wings are tinted with lemon-yellow in the male, and generally hyaline in the female. In Australia, the distribution is in suitable habitat in the north and eastern part of the continent from the top end of the Northern Territory to the northern half of Queensland. The taxon has not been assessed in the IUCN Red List, but it is listed in the Catalogue of Life.

Gallery

See also
 List of Odonata species of Australia

References 

Platycnemididae
Odonata of Australia
Insects of Australia
Endemic fauna of Australia
Taxa named by Maurits Anne Lieftinck
Insects described in 1933
Damselflies